William Johnson (born February 3, 1953) is an American former handball player who competed in the 1976 Summer Olympics.

Life 
He was born in New York City. He played basketball for the Ramapo High School (New York). He received a BS in Physical Education from the Adelphi University.

Handball 
In January 1972 he was approached by the Adelphi handball coach and former national team player Laszlo Jurak to play handball because he is left-handed. He thought first Jurak is talking about American handball. He declined the offered first but later joined the team. In his first game he scored two goals. As sophomore and junior he won the Men's Open Division (Adults Championship) with Adelphi.

In 1976 he was part of the American team which finished tenth in the Olympic tournament. He played two matches and scored one goal.

References

External links
 profile

1953 births
Living people
Sportspeople from New York City
American male handball players
Olympic handball players of the United States
Handball players at the 1976 Summer Olympics